Dixville may refer to:

Dixville, New Hampshire, United States
Dixville, Quebec, Canada
Dixville, Liberia